The following is a list of Michigan State Historic Sites in Isabella County, Michigan. Sites marked with a dagger (†) are also listed on the National Register of Historic Places in Isabella County, Michigan.


Current listings

See also
 National Register of Historic Places listings in Isabella County, Michigan

Sources
 Historic Sites Online – Isabella County. Michigan State Housing Developmental Authority. Accessed January 23, 2011.

References

Isabella County
State Historic Sites
Tourist attractions in Isabella County, Michigan